Pristimantis w-nigrum, also known as the Zurucuchu robber frog or w rainfrog, is a species of frog in the family Strabomantidae. It is found on both Pacific and Amazonian slopes of the Andes in Colombia, Ecuador, and northern Peru. The species is divided to at least eight clades that are genetically highly divergent but morphologically similar; it may be a species complex.

Description
Pristimantis w-nigrum males measure  in snout–vent length and females measure . Live specimens are easily recognized by a colour pattern of yellow with black markings on the groin, anterior and posterior surfaces of thighs, and concealed shank. Tympanum is distinct.

Habitat
The natural habitats of Pristimantis w-nigrum are cloud forest and sub-páramo, but it occurs also in deforested and disturbed areas. It is a nocturnal species that can be found perched on vegetation up to 3 metres above ground; during the day it can be found on fallen leaves. It is a common species although it has declined in many areas.

References

w-nigrum
Frogs of South America
Amphibians of the Andes
Amphibians of Colombia
Amphibians of Ecuador
Amphibians of Peru
Taxa named by Oskar Boettger
Amphibians described in 1892
Taxonomy articles created by Polbot